Rhizobium lusitanum is a Gram negative root nodule bacteria, specifically nodulating Phaseolus vulgaris. Its type strain is P1-7T (=LMG 22705T =CECT 7016T).

References

Further reading

Pongslip, Neelawan. Phenotypic and Genotypic Diversity of Rhizobia. Bentham Science Publishers, 2012.

External links

LPSN
Type strain of Rhizobium lusitanum at BacDive -  the Bacterial Diversity Metadatabase

Rhizobiaceae
Bacteria described in 2006